Tropical Storm Oscar may refer to: 

In the Atlantic Ocean: 
 Tropical Storm Oscar (2012) – A minimal tropical storm that formed in the open ocean.
 Hurricane Oscar (2018) – A Category 2 hurricane that did not affect land.

In the Western Pacific Ocean: 
 Typhoon Oscar (1995) (T9518, 17W) – A powerful typhoon that affected Japan.

In the Southern Hemisphere: 
 Cyclone Oscar (1983)
 Cyclone Oscar (1993)
 Cyclone Oscar-Itseng (2004)

Atlantic hurricane set index articles
Pacific typhoon set index articles
South-West Indian Ocean cyclone set index articles
Australian region cyclone set index articles